The 1977 Rothmans International Series was an Australian motor racing competition open to Formula 5000 Racing Cars. The series, which was the second Rothmans International Series, was won by Warwick Brown driving a Lola T430 Chevrolet.

Schedule

The series was contested over four rounds with one race per round.

Points system
Series points were awarded on a 9-6-4-3-2-1 basis for the first six places at each round.

Series results

There were only five classified finishers at the Sandown Park round.

References

Rothmans International Series
Rothmans
Formula 5000